= Beenapur =

- village
- Location within Madhya Pradesh Location within India
- Coordinates: 23.3713045°N 77.38699°E
- Country: India
- State: Madhya Pradesh
- District: Bhopal
- Tehsil: Huzur
- Elevation: 504 m (1,654 ft)

Population (2011)
  - Total: 1,034
- Time zone: UTC+5:30 (IST)
- ISO 3166 code: MP-IN
- 2011 census code: 482385

Beenapur is a village in the Bhopal district of Madhya Pradesh, India. It is located in the Huzur tehsil and the Phanda block.

== Demographics ==
According to the 2011 census of India, Beenapur has 198 households. The effective literacy rate (i.e. the literacy rate of population excluding children aged 6 and below) is 78.29%.

Demographics (2011 Census)
	Total	Male	Female
Population	1034	517	517
Children aged below 6 years	145	76	69
Scheduled caste	138	61	77
Scheduled tribe	6	2	4
Literates	696	384	312
Workers (all)	480	264	216
Main workers (total)	460	256	204
Main workers: Cultivators	176	97	79
Main workers: Agricultural labourers	134	77	57
Main workers: Household industry workers	24	16	8
Main workers: Other	126	66	60
Marginal workers (total)	20	8	12
Marginal workers: Cultivators	3	1	2
Marginal workers: Agricultural labourers	13	3	10
Marginal workers: Household industry workers	0	0	0
Marginal workers: Others	4	4	0
Non-workers	554	253	301
